Panoquina evansi, or Evans's skipper, is a species of grass skipper in the butterfly family Hesperiidae.

The MONA or Hodges number for Panoquina evansi is 4122.

References

Further reading

 

Panoquina
Articles created by Qbugbot
Butterflies described in 1946